Sungai Mati ('dead river' in Malay) is a small town in , Tangkak District, Johor, Malaysia.

Sungai Mati was named in such a way (dead river) is due to its nature of being an ox-bow lake. It formed or breakaway from main river of Muar River. The "breakaway" cause by a massive flood in early 1900s (not traceable). Before the breakaway Sungai Mati was on the Muar river bank (northern bank) and was a river port.

Before the breakaway Sungai Mati was named 'li hong kang' 利丰港. It means a prosperous port. Until now, the Chinese community still using the same name, which carries both extreme meaning. In fact it was an inland/river port. Muar River and Pahang River in combination was a very important east-west crossing route for traditional river transport. The route called "Laluan Penarikan", which is documented and available in Malaysia secondary history text. The piece of land surrounded by the ex-bow lake and Muar River in combination is called Pulau Penarik.

In early 1970s, there were some remaining traces of the river port. There was landing of jetty at the end of Jalan Raja, the current location of bridge linking Sungai Mati and Pulau Penarik. On the current badminton and tennis court on the left of Jalan Raja, diagonally opposite incumbent Johor Menteri Besar resident, were old warehouses.

Notable residents
 Tan Sri Abdul Ghani Othman, the 14th Menteri Besar of Johor.

Towns in Johor
Towns, suburbs and villages in Tangkak